Harald Barlie (4 January 1937 – 12 October 1995) was a Norwegian Greco-Roman wrestler.

He was born at Klemetsrud and died in Oslo, and represented the sports clubs Oslo BK and SK av 1909. He was a brother of Åge, Kåre and Oddvar Barlie, an uncle of Ine and Mette Barlie and granduncle of Lene Barlie, all wrestlers.

Competing mostly in the welterweight or middleweight divisions, he finished sixth at both the 1966 European Wrestling Championships, the 1968 European Wrestling Championships and the 1970 World Wrestling Championships. He competed at the Summer Olympics in 1960, 1964, 1968 and 1972. Between 1959 and 1977 he took a total of seventeen Norwegian national titles. He became Nordic champion in 1968 and 1971.

References

External links
 

1937 births
1995 deaths
Sportspeople from Oslo
Welterweight boxers
Middleweight boxers
Light-heavyweight boxers
Wrestlers at the 1960 Summer Olympics
Wrestlers at the 1964 Summer Olympics
Wrestlers at the 1968 Summer Olympics
Wrestlers at the 1972 Summer Olympics
Norwegian male sport wrestlers
Olympic wrestlers of Norway
20th-century Norwegian people